The Galleria at Fort Lauderdale is an upscale super regional shopping mall on Sunrise Boulevard in Fort Lauderdale, Florida. It was originally constructed in 1954 as the open-air shopping mall the Sunrise Center.

The mall is owned by Keystone Florida Property Holding Corporation, a title holding company for the Pennsylvania Public School Employees' Retirement System. The mall managed by the Kravco Company and its successors Kravco Simon and Simon Property Group up until May 2012, when management was taken over by Jones Lang LaSalle.

History 
The Galleria was originally the Sunrise Center, an open-air shopping mall constructed in 1954, but was demolished except for the Jordan Marsh store (reopened as South Florida’s first Dillard's, followed by Pembroke Lakes Mall in 1995 and The Mall at Wellington Green in 2001), and rebuilt as an enclosed mall. The Galleria opened in three phases, initially on November 11, 1980 with Burdines (now Macy's) and Saks Fifth Avenue (mostly now H&M and IWG), second in 1982 featuring Neiman Marcus (which closed in 2020 following an announcement on July 23) and lastly in 1983 with Lord & Taylor (partially now Powerhouse Gym).

The Pennsylvania Public School Employees' Retirement System pension fund bought the mall in 1993 for $125 million.

From 2001 to 2003, $44 million was spent on renovations that included bringing in palm trees, opening windows and adding tri-color floor tiles.

In 2014, redevelopment of the area around The Galleria was proposed, with 1,600 condos and 150 hotel rooms. The redevelopment never materialized due to community opposition.

In 2018, an aquarium was proposed for the space previously occupied by Lord & Taylor. Aquarium operator SeaQuest proposed adding 1,200 marine animals, including sharks and stingrays to the space. The plan never materialized.

Current anchors

Dillard's; 
H&M; 
Macy's;

Former anchors
Burdines (converted to Macy's in 2005)
Jordan Marsh (closed in 1991 and became Dillard's in 1993)
Lord & Taylor (closed in February 2002 and is now partially split into a 22,000 square foot Powerhouse Gym and a 63,000 square foot vacant space.)
Neiman Marcus (closed in September 2020)
Saks Fifth Avenue (closed in July 2008, became a Publix Health and Fitness Expo in 2011, then mostly split into a 28,000 square foot H&M and a 22,781 square foot IWG in 2016 with a 22,000 square foot vacant space)

References

External links
The Galleria at Fort Lauderdale official website

Buildings and structures in Fort Lauderdale, Florida
Shopping malls in Broward County, Florida
Economy of Fort Lauderdale, Florida
Shopping malls established in 1980
Simon Property Group
Tourist attractions in Fort Lauderdale, Florida
1980 establishments in Florida